Warsheekh District is a district in the southeastern Middle Shebelle (Shabeellaha Dhexe) region of Somalia. Its capital lies at Warsheikh.

Districts of Somalia